The Leichhardt Campus of the Sydney Secondary College is a government-funded, co-educational, dual modality, partially academically selective and comprehensive junior secondary day school, located in the inner-western Sydney suburb of Leichhardt, New South Wales, Australia. Together with the senior school at the Blackwattle Bay Campus and the other junior school at Balmain Campus, the school is a part of the Sydney Secondary College.

Established in 2002, the campus caters for approximately 1000 students from Year 7 to Year 10.

History

Prior to 2002, the school was known as Leichhardt High School which was originally founded as a co-educational and comprehensive school in 1972. Established in an area with a large number of migrant families, particularly from Mediterranean backgrounds, the school has long been known for its diversity of cultural backgrounds. This led to focused funding and pedagogical approaches towards students of non English-speaking backgrounds.

Declining enrolments at the school, together with a push towards multi-campus colleges (i.e., also including the later established Northern Beaches Secondary College and Georges River College among others) led to the amalgamation of former high schools, Leichhardt High School, Balmain High School and Glebe High School into Sydney Secondary College in 2002. In the first year after establishment, the college had a combined enrolment of 1,800, up from 1,250 in 2003.

In 2003, Sydney Secondary College was one of 36 public schools to receive an Excellence Award from the former NSW Department of Education's director-general, Jan McClelland, for its "promotion of public education".

From 2011 onwards, as part of the Smarter Schools National Partnership on Improving Teacher Quality, the school was involved in an alliance with the Balmain Campus and Campus of the Georges River College as a Centre for Excellence.

Leichhardt Council has proposed that two heritage former tramway buildings, situated next to the school, be handed over and made into a performing arts centre for the students. The school supports the handover, but the government is unwilling to allow access to the buildings.

Curriculum & Extracurriculars 
The school offers an extensive range of subjects in its curriculum. The academic staff is organised into several faculties: English, Mathematics, Science, HSIE, Languages, Technology and Applied Studies (TAS), Creative and Performing Arts (CAPA), and PDHPE. The school also offers various extracurricular opportunities for students such as Theatresports, the Student Representative Council (SRC), the Talented Athlete Program (TAP), the Instrumental Music Program (IMP), the Duke of Edinburgh Scheme and the annual school production.

Stage 4 
In Years 7 and 8, students are required to study mandatory core subjects such as Mathematics, English, History, Geography, Science and PDHPE as well as Music, Visual Arts, Drama (Year 7 only), Industrial Technology and Food Technology as electives.

Stage 5 
In Years 9 and 10, students are required to study mandatory core subjects such as Mathematics, English, History, Geography, Science and PDHPE.

Courses offered in Stage 5 are*:

 Aboriginal Studies
 Child Studies
 Chinese
 Commerce
 Drama
 Food Technology
 French
 Geography (Elective)
 History (Elective)
 Industrial Technology - Engineering
 Industrial Technology - Multimedia
 Information and Software Technology
 Italian
 International Studies
 iSTEM
 Music
 Photographic and Digital Media
 Physical Activity and Sports Studies (PASS)
 Visual Arts

*Availability of each course is dependent on student demand

VIBE Electives 
In 2020, Leichhardt Campus launched 100-hour VIBEs (Various Interest Based Electives) which offer engagement and enrichment opportunities for students. These courses will run for one year and 100 hours (one to be completed in Year 9 and another to be completed in Year 10). These interest/enrichment electives will not form part of the Record of School Achievement (RoSA). The VIBE engagement and enrichment electives are designed to engage students in inquiry-based projects that develop extraordinary creativity, critical thinking, communication, collaboration and reflective thinking skills.

VIBE electives offered are*:

 ACCORD
 Activism
 After the Fall
 Bean to Barista
 Celebrating Inclusiveness with Multiculturalism (CIM)
 Creative Writing for Publication‌
 CSI - True Crime
 Dance and Creative Movement
 Enviromaths
 Environmental Science
 Leichhardt TV
 Navigating Life
 Opportunities and Pathways in Physical Activity in Sport (OPPS)
 Overlords - Drones and Robots
 Philosophy
 Psychology
 The Great Outdoors—Survive & Thrive
 Short Film Making
 Spoken Word Poetry
 Song Writing and Production (SWAP)
 Sport Sociology
 Stage Production
 Upcycle Me
 Visual Design
 Work Education

*Availability of each course is dependent on student demand

Sport 
At Sydney Secondary College, sport is a strong focus of all three campuses. There are three annual combined college carnivals: Swimming, Cross Country and Athletics. After each College sporting event, the top two male and female participants for each age group and every event are invited to compete at the Bligh Zone carnivals against other schools in the local sporting zone.

The college has four respective sporting colour houses named after local sporting identities:

  Stewart (Geoff Stewart)
  Pearce (Wayne Pearce)
  Woods (Taryn Woods)
  Sauvage (Louise Sauvage)
Students are also given the opportunity to participate in a variety of competitive team sports against other schools such as soccer, netball, basketball, volleyball, European handball, touch football, cricket and softball as well as recreational and social sports such as cycling, dance/yoga, badminton, golf, table tennis, fitness walking, handball, martial arts and tennis.

Facilities

Lostock

The property is used for school excursions and camps, and also provides facilities for families of staff and students as a "weekender". The property is home to an abundance of wildlife, including wombat and platypus colonies.

Notable alumni
 Wayne Pearceprofessional rugby league player
 Naomi Sequeiraactress and singer
 Renuga Veeranbadminton player; represented Australia at the 2012 Olympics

See also 

 List of government schools in New South Wales
 List of selective high schools in New South Wales

References

External links

Selective schools in New South Wales
Public high schools in Sydney
Educational institutions established in 2002
2002 establishments in Australia
Inner West